This is a list of flag bearers who have represented Bulgaria at the Olympics.

Flag bearers carry the national flag of their country at the opening ceremony of the Olympic Games.

See also
Bulgaria at the Olympics

References

Bulgaria at the Olympics
Bulgaria
Olympic